See also: Timeline of Nigerian history

Incumbents

Federal government
 President: Olusegun Obasanjo (PDP)
 Vice President: Atiku Abubakar (PDP)
 Senate President: Anyim Pius Anyim (PDP)
 House Speaker: Ghali Umar Na'Abba (PDP) 
 Chief Justice: Muhammad Lawal Uwais

Governors
 Abia State:
 Adamawa State: 
 Akwa Ibom State:
 Anambra State: 
 Bauchi State: 
 Bayelsa State: 
 Bendel State: 
 Benue State: 
 Borno State: 
 Cross River State: 
 Delta State: 
 Eastern Region: 
 Ebonyi State: 
 Edo State: 
 Ekiti State: 
 Enugu State: 
 Gombe State: 
 Gongola State: 
 Imo State: 
 Jigawa State: 
 Kaduna State: 
 Kano State: 
 Katsina State: 
 Kebbi State: 
 Kogi State: 
 Kwara State: 
 Lagos State: 
 Nasarawa State: 
 Niger State: 
 Ogun State: 
 Ondo State: 
 Osun State: 
 Oyo State:
 Plateau State: 
 Rivers State: Peter Odili (PDP)
 Sokoto State: 
 Taraba State: 
 Western State: 
 Yobe State:

Events

January
January 27 - Lagos Armoury Explosion

May

October
October 10 — The International Court of Justice (ICJ) ruled against Nigeria in favor of Cameroon over the disputed oil-rich Bakassi peninsula territory.

November
November — Religious riots erupt over the Miss World pageant hosted in Abuja; The pageant is subsequently moved to London.

 
2000s in Nigeria
Years of the 21st century in Nigeria
Nigeria
Nigeria